Moquiniella is a monotypic genus of flowering plants belonging to the family Loranthaceae. It only contains one known species, Moquiniella rubra (A.Spreng.) Balle

It is native to Namibia and the Cape Provinces (region in South Africa).

The genus name of Moquiniella is in honour of Alfred Moquin-Tandon (1804–1863), a French naturalist and doctor. The genus of Moquiniella has 2 known synonyms, Lichtensteinia  and Moquinia .
The Latin specific epithet of rubra means red.
Both the genus and the species were first described and published in Bull. Séances Inst. Roy. Colon. Belge Vol.25 on pages 1628-1630 in 1954.

References

Loranthaceae
Loranthaceae genera
Plants described in 1954
Flora of Namibia
Flora of the Cape Provinces